Zhaba, also known as Bazi, Bozi, Draba, nDrapa, Zaba, Zha (Chinese: 扎坝语 or 扎巴语), is a Qiangic language of Sichuan, China spoken by about 8,000 people in Daofu County and Yajiang County. Zhaba speakers live primarily in the Xianshui River 鲜水河 valley.

Descriptions of Zhaba include Huang (1991) and Gong (2007). Huang & Dai (1992) document the Queyu dialect spoken in Zhatuo Village 扎拖村, Zhatuo Township 扎拖乡, Daofu County, Sichuan.

Phonology 

 /f/ is found only in Chinese loans.
 /l/ and /ɬ/ contrast only in Tibetan loans.
 /ʐ/ and /r/ may interchange word-initially; but they are contrastive when occurring in the second syllable of words.

Dialects
Ethnologue (21st edition) lists two dialects of Zhaba:
Drate (Northern nDrapa)
Drame (Southern nDrapa, Zhami)

Distribution
A total of 8,319 Zhaba people are distributed in the following townships of Zhaba District 扎坝区 of Daofu County (Upper Zha 上扎 area), and Zhamai District 扎麦区 of Yajiang County (Lower Zha 下扎 area) (Gong 2007:2-3). Zhaba people from the two districts speak the same mutually intelligible language.

Zhaba District 扎坝区, Daofu County (Upper Zha 上扎 area)
Yazhuo 亚卓乡: 1,501 Zhaba people
Hongding 红顶乡: 752 Zhaba people
Zhongni 仲尼乡: 970 Zhaba people
Zhatuo 扎拖乡: 1,114 Zhaba people
Xiatuo 下拖乡: 899 Zhaba people
Zhamai District 扎麦区, Yajiang County (Lower Zha 下扎 area)
Waduo 瓦多乡: 1,536 Zhaba people
Murong 木绒乡: 1,547 Zhaba people

References

Qiangic languages
Languages of China